Olivaea is a genus of Mexican flowering plants in the aster tribe within the daisy family.

 Species
 Olivaea leptocarpa DeJong & Beaman - Durango
 Olivaea tricuspis Sch.Bip. - Jalisco, México State

References

Asteraceae genera
Astereae
Endemic flora of Mexico